Roxbury is an unincorporated community located off the Blue Mountain exit of the Pennsylvania Turnpike (Interstate 76) in Lurgan Township, Franklin County, Pennsylvania, United States. Route 641 and Route 997 meet there.

Roxbury was laid out circa 1778. A post office called Roxbury has been in operation since 1822.

Notable person
• Carl Cover, (1893-1944) aviation pioneer

References

External links

Unincorporated communities in Franklin County, Pennsylvania
Unincorporated communities in Pennsylvania